José Ignacio Cabrujas Lofiego (July 17, 1937 – October 21, 1995 in Porlamar, Margarita Island) was a Venezuelan playwright, theater director, chronicler, soap opera writer, drama librettist, screenplay writer, radio moderator, humanist and political campaigns designer. He is considered one of the founders and innovators of the modern telenovela genre in Latin America, and is called the "Maestro de las Telenovelas."

Early years
José Ignacio Cabrujas spent his childhood in the Caracas neighborhood of Catia. His parents were José Ramón Cabruja Esteso and Matilde Lofiego of Cabruja. His original name is "Cabruja" so he was changed when the a story emerged during his tenure in the Teatro Universitario (TU). The confusion arises from the renowned journalist Lorenzo Batallán, who published a note on the Cabrujas' performance at TU, adding an "S". Apparently the young actor was pleased and decided to continue using the 'S', so he came to be known as "José Ignacio Cabrujas."

Career 
After reading Les Misérables by Victor Hugo as a youth, he decided to be a writer. In fact, he couldn't stop crying and was so involved in his exaltation that he said: "This is what I want to do in life; these letters, these pages have produced in me all this emotion ...it's a miracle; I want to be part of that miracle."

In 1956, thanks to a grant, he began studying law at the Universidad Central de Venezuela. After two years of studying law, his second brother, Francisco Cabrujas, was born (Today, he is involved in film and soap opera's scoring). But José Ignacio's sudden entrance in the university theater revealed his true vocation, and so he left the University.

Family 
He married three times: to Democracia Lopez (1960-1965), to Eva Ivanyi (who was his costume maker and producer), and the famous Venezuelan singer, musicologist and choral director Isabel Palacios (1985 - 1990). He had 2 sons: Juan Francisco Cabrujas (1961) and Diego Cabrujas (1987). He had one sister, Martha Cabrujas, who is involved in the plastic arts.

Printed and electronic publications about his life and work 
 1979: «Tres dramaturgos venezolanos de hoy R. Chalbaud, J.I. Cabrujas, I. Chocrón»  by Gleider Hernández-Almeida, text published by the Nuevo Grupo.
 1983: «Cabrujas en Tres Actos»  by Leonardo Azparren Jiménez, text published by the Nuevo Grupo.
 1991: «El Teatro Según Cabrujas», 
 1994: «Catia en Tres Voces»    by Milagro Socorro, where she interviews Cabrujas about his childhood in Catia.
 1995: «Cabrujerías: un estudio sobre la dramática de José Ignacio Cabrujas»   by Francisco Rojas Pozo 
 1999: «La Caracas de Cabrujas»  by Ibsen Martínez.
 1999: «Descubriendo a José Ignacio Cabrujas Un hombre... Un Artista... Una Conciencia...» Claudy De Sousa's Degree's Thesis .
 2000: «Venezuela: La Obra Inconclusa de José Ignacio Cabrujas»   Yoyiana Ahumada's, MSc. Thesis
 2006: «Premios Nacionales de Cultura: Teatro José Ignacio Cabrujas 1989»  by Gloria Soares, in which she collects information and references notes divided into seven chapters to organize and summarize his work.
 2006: «Cabrujas, ese ángel terrible: seis miradas de taller»    by Yoyiana Ahumada and La Fundación, in collaboration with Manuel Felipe Sierra, Daniel Gutierrez, Eduardo Fermin Furiati Claudia Paez,  Iraida Tapias and Arnaldo Gutierrez.
 2009: «Historia y cotidianidad en la dramaturgia de José Ignacio Cabrujas»  by Magaly Guerrero 
 2009: «El Mundo Según Cabrujas»   by Yoyiana Ahumada Licea. An essay which contains a compilation of his press-published research articles.
 2010: «Obra Dramática»  by  Leonardo Azparren Giménez y Gloria Soares De Ponte. Contains 16 of his plays, a biography, a chronology and texts from Nicolas Curiel, published in three volumes: https://wikimania2015.wikimedia.org/wiki/Special:MyLanguage/Wikimaniapublished
 2012: «José Ignacio Cabrujas habla y escribe» (two volumes)  . by Leonardo Azparren Giménez. An anthology of interviews, conversations, essays and newspaper articles with an introduction study by Alberto Barrera Tyszka.

Selected filmography
 La quema de Judas (1975)

Telenovelas
 LA SEÑORA DE CARDENAS
 La Señora de Cardenas .... Venezuela (1977) with Doris Wells and Miguel Ángel Landa
SANGRE AZUL
 Sangre azul ... Venezuela (1979) with  Pierina España and José Luis Rodríguez
 NATALIA DE 8 A 9
 Natalia de 8 a 9 .... Venezuela (1980) with Marina Baura and María Conchita Alonso
 Vivir por ti .... Mexico (2008)
 LA DUEÑA
 La Dueña .... Venezuela (1985) with Amanda Gutiérrez and Daniel Alvarado
 Dueña y Señora .... Puerto Rico (2006) with Karla Monroig and Angel Viera
 La Patrona .... Mexico, USA (2013) with Aracely Arambula and Jorge Luis Pila
 La Patrona .... Mexico, USA (2018)
 LA DAMA DE ROSA
 La dama de rosa .... Venezuela (1986) with Jeannette Rodríguez and Carlos Mata
 Cambio de Piel .... Venezuela (1997) with Coraima Torres and Eduardo Serrano
 Géminis, venganza de amor .... Spain (2002)

References

External links
 

Venezuelan male writers
Venezuelan male film actors
Venezuelan dramatists and playwrights
Venezuelan journalists
1937 births
1995 deaths
Venezuelan screenwriters
People from Caracas
20th-century dramatists and playwrights
20th-century Venezuelan male actors
20th-century male writers
20th-century screenwriters
20th-century journalists